Chalosse Noire is a synonym for several wine grapes including:

Béquignol noir
Canari noir
Jurançon
Négrette